Rongorongo (pron. ;) is a system of glyphs discovered in the 19th century on Rapa Nui (Easter Island) that appears to be writing or proto-writing. Numerous attempts at decipherment have been made, with none being successful. Although some calendrical and what might prove to be genealogical information has been identified, none of these glyphs can actually be read. If rongorongo does prove to be writing and proves to be an independent invention, it would be one of very few independent inventions of writing in human history.

Two dozen wooden objects bearing rongorongo inscriptions, some heavily weathered, burned, or otherwise damaged, were collected in the late 19th century and are now scattered in museums and private collections. None remain on Easter Island. The objects are mostly tablets shaped from irregular pieces of wood, sometimes driftwood, but include a chieftain's staff, a bird-man statuette, and two reimiro ornaments. There are also a few petroglyphs which may include short rongorongo inscriptions. Oral history suggests that only a small elite was ever literate and that the tablets were sacred.

Authentic rongorongo texts are written in alternating directions, a system called reverse boustrophedon. In a third of the tablets, the lines of text are inscribed in shallow fluting carved into the wood. The glyphs themselves are outlines of human, animal, plant, artifact and geometric forms. Many of the human and animal figures, such as glyphs  and  have characteristic protuberances on each side of the head, possibly representing eyes.

Individual texts are conventionally known by a single uppercase letter and a name, such as Tablet C, the Mamari Tablet. The somewhat variable names may be descriptive or indicate where the object is kept, as in the Oar, the Snuffbox, the Small Santiago Tablet, and the Santiago Staff.

Etymology and variant names
 is the modern name for the inscriptions. In the Rapa Nui language it means "to recite, to declaim, to chant out".

There are also said to have been more specific names for the texts based on their topic.

Barthel recorded that, "The Islanders had another writing (the so-called "tau script") which recorded their annals and other secular matters, but this has disappeared." In the 1880s, a group of elders invented a derivative 'script' [also] called  with which to decorate carvings in order to increase their trading value.

Form and construction

The forms of the glyphs are standardized contours of living organisms and geometric designs about one centimeter high. The wooden tablets are irregular in shape and, in many instances, fluted (tablets B, E, G, H, O, Q, and possibly T), with the glyphs carved in shallow channels running the length of the tablets, as can be seen in the image of tablet G at right. It is thought that irregular and often blemished pieces of wood were used in their entirety rather than squared off due to the scarcity of wood on the island.

Writing media

Except for a few possible glyphs cut in stone (see petroglyphs), and one possibility on barkcloth, all surviving secure texts are inscribed in wood. According to tradition, the tablets were made of toromiro wood. However, Catherine Orliac (2005) examined seven objects (tablets B, C, G, H, K, Q, and  L) with stereo optical and scanning electron microscopes and determined that all were instead made from Pacific rosewood (Thespesia populnea); the same identification had been made for tablet M in 1934. This 15-meter tree, known as "Pacific rosewood" for its color and called  in Rapanui, is used for sacred groves and carvings throughout eastern Polynesia and was evidently brought to Easter Island by the first settlers. However, not all the wood was native: Orliac (2007) established that tablets N, P, and S were made of South African yellowwood (Podocarpus latifolius) and therefore that the wood had arrived with Western contact. Fischer describes P as "a damaged and reshapen European or American oar", as are A (which is European ash, Fraxinus excelsior) and V; notes that wood from the wreck of a Western boat was said to have been used for many tablets; and that both P and S had been recycled as planking for a Rapanui driftwood canoe, suggesting that by that time the tablets had little value to the islanders as texts. Several texts, including O, are carved on gnarled driftwood. The fact that the islanders were reduced to inscribing driftwood, and were regardless extremely economical in their use of wood, may have had consequences for the structure of the script, such as the abundance of ligatures and potentially a telegraphic style of writing that would complicate textual analysis.

William J. Thomson reported a calabash, now lost, that had been found in a tomb and was "covered with hieroglyphics similar to those found on the incised tablets." During the early missionary period that began in 1864, it was reported that women wore bark cloth decorated with "symbols"; a fragment of one of these survives, and appears to be rongorongo.

Oral tradition holds that, because of the great value of wood, only expert scribes used it, while pupils wrote on banana leaves. German ethnologist Thomas Barthel believed that carving on wood was a secondary development in the evolution of the script based on an earlier stage of incising banana leaves or the sheaths of the banana trunk with a bone stylus, and that the medium of leaves was retained not only for lessons but to plan and compose the texts of the wooden tablets. He found experimentally that the glyphs were quite visible on banana leaves due to the sap that emerged from the cuts and dried on the surface. However, when the leaves themselves dried they became brittle and would not have survived for long.

Barthel speculated that the banana leaf might even have served as a prototype for the tablets, with the fluted surface of the tablets an emulation of the veined structure of a leaf:

Direction of writing

Larger tablets and staves may have been read without turning, if the reader were able to read upside-down.

Writing instruments 

According to oral tradition, scribes used obsidian flakes or small shark teeth, presumably the hafted tools still used to carve wood in Polynesia, to flute and polish the tablets and then to incise the glyphs. The glyphs are most commonly composed of deep smooth cuts, though superficial hair-line cuts are also found. In the closeup image at right, a glyph is composed of two parts connected by a hair-line cut; this is a typical convention for this shape. Several researchers, including Barthel, believe that these superficial cuts were made by obsidian, and that the texts were carved in a two-stage process, first sketched with obsidian and then deepened and finished with a worn shark tooth. The remaining hair-line cuts were then either errors, design conventions (as at right), or decorative embellishments. Vertical strings of chevrons or lozenges, for example, are typically connected with hair-line cuts, as can be seen repeatedly in the closeup of one end of tablet B below. However, Barthel was told that the last literate Rapanui king, Ngaara, sketched out the glyphs in soot applied with a fish bone and then engraved them with a shark tooth.

Tablet N, on the other hand, shows no sign of shark teeth. Haberlandt noticed that the glyphs of this text appear to have been incised with a sharpened bone, as evidenced by the shallowness and width of the grooves. N also "displays secondary working with obsidian flakes to elaborate details within the finished contour lines. No other rongo-rongo inscription reveals such graphic extravagance".

Other tablets appear to have been cut with a steel blade, often rather crudely. Although steel knives were available after the arrival of the Spanish, this does cast suspicion on the authenticity of these tablets.

Glyphs

The glyphs are stylized human, animal, vegetable and geometric shapes, and often form compounds. Nearly all those with heads are oriented head up and are either seen face on or in profile to the right, in the direction of writing. It is not known what significance turning a glyph head-down or to the left may have had. Heads often have characteristic projections on the sides which may be eyes (as on the sea turtle glyph below, and more clearly on sea-turtle petroglyphs) but which often resemble ears (as on the anthropomorphic petroglyph in the next section). Birds are common; many resemble the frigatebird (see image directly below) which was associated with the supreme god Makemake.

Origin
Oral tradition holds that either Hotu Matua or Tuu ko Iho, the legendary founder(s) of Rapa Nui, brought 67tablets from their homeland. The same founder is also credited with bringing indigenous plants such as the toromiro. However, there is no homeland likely to have had a tradition of writing in Polynesia or even in South America. Thus rongorongo appears to have been an internal development. Given that few if any of the Rapanui people remaining on the island in the 1870s could read the glyphs, it is likely that only a small minority were ever literate. Indeed, early visitors were told that literacy was a privilege of the ruling families and priests who were all kidnapped in the Peruvian slaving raids or died soon afterwards in the resulting epidemics.

Dating the tablets
Little direct dating has been done. The start of forest-clearing for agriculture on Easter Island, and thus presumably colonization, has been dated to circa 1200, implying a date for the invention of rongorongo no earlier than the 13th century. Tablet Q (Small Saint Petersburg) is the sole item that has been carbon dated, but the results only constrain the date to sometime after 1680. Glyph 67 is thought to represent the extinct Easter Island palm, which disappeared from the island's pollen record circa 1650, suggesting that the script itself is at least that old.

Texts A, P, and V can be dated to the 18th or 19th century by virtue of being inscribed on European oars. Analysis of charcoal indicates that the forest disappeared in the first half of the 17th century. Roggeveen, who discovered Easter Island in 1722, described the island as "destitute of large trees" and in 1770 González de Ahedo wrote, "Not a single tree is to be found capable of furnishing a plank so much as six inches [15cm] in width." Forster, with Cook's expedition of 1774, reported that "there was not a tree upon the island which exceeded the height of 10feet [3m]."

All of these methods date the wood, not the inscriptions themselves. Pacific rosewood is not durable, and is unlikely to survive long in Easter Island's climate.

1770 Spanish expedition

In 1770 the Spanish annexed Easter Island under Captain González de Ahedo. A signing ceremony was held in which a treaty of annexation was signed by an undisclosed number of chiefs "by marking upon it certain characters in their own form of script." (Reproduction at right.)

Several scholars have suggested that rongorongo may have been an invention inspired by this visit and the signing of the treaty of annexation. As circumstantial evidence, they note that no explorer reported the script prior to Eugène Eyraud in 1864, 

However, known cases of the diffusion of writing, such as Sequoyah's invention of the Cherokee syllabary after seeing the power of English-language newspapers, or Uyaquk's invention of the Yugtun script inspired by readings from Christian scripture, involved greater contact than the signing of a single treaty. The glyphs could be crudely written rongorongo, as might be expected for Rapa Nui representatives writing with the novel instrument of pen on paper.

Petroglyphs 

Easter Island has the richest assortment of petroglyphs in Polynesia.

Historical record

Discovery
Eugène Eyraud, a lay friar of the Congrégation de Picpus, landed on Easter Island on January 2, 1864, on the 24th day of his departure from Valparaíso. He was to remain on Easter Island for nine months, evangelizing its inhabitants. He wrote an account of his stay in which he reports his discovery of the tablets that year:

Destruction
In 1868 the Bishop of Tahiti, Florentin-Étienne "Tepano" Jaussen, received a gift from the recent Catholic converts of Easter Island. It was a long cord of human hair, a fishing line perhaps, wound around a small wooden board covered in hieroglyphic writing. Stunned at the discovery, he wrote to Father Hippolyte Roussel on Easter Island to collect all the tablets and to find natives capable of translating them. But Roussel could only recover a few, and the islanders could not agree on how to read them.

Yet Eyraud had seen hundreds of tablets only four years earlier. What happened to the missing tablets is a matter of conjecture. Eyraud had noted how little interest their owners had in them. Stéphen Chauvet reports that,

Tablets S and P had been cut into lashed planking for a canoe, which fits the story of a man named Niari who made a canoe out of abandoned tablets.

As European-introduced diseases and raids by Peruvian slavers, including a final devastating raid in 1862 and a subsequent smallpox epidemic, had reduced the Rapa Nui population to under two hundred by the 1870s, it is possible that literacy had been wiped out by the time Eyraud discovered the tablets in 1866.

Thus in 1868 Jaussen could recover only a few tablets, with three more acquired by Captain Gana of the Chilean corvette O'Higgins in 1870. In the 1950s Barthel found the decayed remains of half a dozen tablets in caves, in the context of burials. However, no glyphs could be salvaged.

Of the 26 commonly accepted texts that survive, only half are in good condition and authentic beyond doubt.

Anthropological accounts
British archaeologist and anthropologist Katherine Routledge undertook a 1914–1915 scientific expedition to Rapa Nui with her husband to catalog the art, customs, and writing of the island. She was able to interview two elderly informants, Kapiera and a leper named Tomenika, who allegedly had some knowledge of rongorongo. The sessions were not very fruitful, as the two often contradicted each other. From them Routledge concluded that rongorongo was an idiosyncratic mnemonic device that did not directly represent language, in other words, proto-writing, and that the meanings of the glyphs were reformulated by each scribe, so that the  could not be read by someone not trained in that specific text. The texts themselves she believed to be litanies for priest-scribes, kept apart in special houses and strictly tapu, that recorded the island's history and mythology.

Corpus
The 26 rongorongo texts with letter codes are inscribed on wooden objects, each with between 2 and 2320 simple glyphs and components of compound glyphs, for over 15,000 in all. The objects are mostly oblong wooden tablets, with the exceptions of I, a possibly sacred chieftain's staff known as the Santiago Staff; J and L, inscribed on reimiro pectoral ornaments worn by the elite; X, inscribed on various parts of a tangata manu ("birdman") statuette; and Y, a European snuff box assembled from sections cut from a rongorongo tablet. The tablets, like the pectorals, statuettes, and staves, were works of art and valued possessions, and were apparently given individual proper names in the same manner as jade ornaments in New Zealand. Two of the tablets, C and S, have a documented pre-missionary provenance, though others may be as old or older. There are in addition a few isolated glyphs or short sequences which might prove to be rongorongo.

Classic texts 

Crude glyphs have been found on a few stone objects and some additional wooden items, but most of these are thought to be fakes created for the early tourism market. Several of the 26 wooden texts are suspect due to uncertain provenance (X, Y, and Z), poor quality craftsmanship (F, K, V, W, Y, and Z), or to having been carved with a steel blade (K, V, and Y), and thus, although they may prove to be genuine, should not be trusted in initial attempts at decipherment. Z resembles many early forgeries in not being boustrophedon, but it may be a palimpsest on an authentic but now illegible text.

Additional texts
In addition to the petroglyphs mentioned above, there are a few other very short uncatalogued texts that may be rongorongo. Fischer reports that "many statuettes reveal  or -like glyphs on their crown." He gives the example of a compound glyph, on the crown of a  statuette.

Glyphs

There is some arbitrariness to which glyphs are grouped together, and there are inconsistencies in the assignments of numerical codes and the use of affixes which make the system rather complex. However, despite its shortcomings, Barthel's is the only effective system ever proposed to categorize rongorongo glyphs.

Barthel (1971) claimed to have parsed the corpus of glyphs to 120, of which the other 480 in his inventory are allographs or ligatures.

Published corpus

For almost a century only a few of the texts were published. In 1875, the director of the Chilean National Museum of Natural History in Santiago, Rudolf Philippi, published the Santiago Staff, and Carroll (1892) published part of the Oar. Most texts remained beyond the reach of would-be decipherers until 1958, when Thomas Barthel published line drawings of almost all the known corpus in his  ("Bases for the Decipherment of the Easter Island script") which remains the fundamental reference to rongorongo. He transcribed texts A through X, over 99% of the corpus; the CEIPP estimates that it is 97% accurate. Barthel's line drawings were not produced free-hand but copied from rubbings, which helped ensure their faithfulness to the originals.

Fischer (1997) published new line drawings. These include lines scored with obsidian but not finished with a shark tooth, which had not been recorded by Barthel because the rubbings he used often did not show them, for example on tablet N. (However, in line Gv4 shown in the section on writing instruments above, the light lines were recorded by both Fischer and Barthel.) There are other omissions in Barthel which Fischer corrects, such as a sequence of glyphs at the transition from line Ca6 to Ca7 which is missing from Barthel, presumably because the carving went over the side of the tablet and was missed by Barthel's rubbing. (This missing sequence is right in the middle of Barthel's calendar.) However, other discrepancies between the two records are straightforward contradictions. For instance, the initial glyph of I12 (line 12 of the Santiago Staff) in Fischer does not correspond with that of Barthel or Philippi, 

In addition, the next glyph (glyph 20, a "spindle with three knobs") is missing its right-side "sprout" (glyph 10) in Philippi's drawing. This may be the result of an error in the inking, since there is a blank space in its place. The corpus is thus tainted with quite some uncertainty. It has never been properly checked for want of high-quality photographs.

Decipherment

As with most undeciphered scripts, there are many fanciful interpretations and claimed translations of rongorongo. However, apart from a portion of one tablet which has been shown to have to do with a lunar Rapa Nui calendar, none of the texts are understood. There are three serious obstacles to decipherment, assuming rongorongo is truly writing: the small number of remaining texts, the lack of context such as illustrations in which to interpret them, and the poor attestation of the Old Rapanui language, since modern Rapanui is heavily mixed with Tahitian and is therefore unlikely to closely reflect the language of the tablets.

The prevailing opinion is that rongorongo is not true writing but proto-writing, or even a more limited mnemonic device for genealogy, choreography, navigation, astronomy, or agriculture. For example, the Atlas of Languages states, "It was probably used as a memory aid or for decorative purposes, not for recording the Rapanui language of the islanders." If this is the case, then there is little hope of ever deciphering it. For those who believe it to be writing, there is debate as to whether rongorongo is essentially logographic or syllabic, though it appears to be compatible with neither a pure logography nor a pure syllabary.

Computer encoding
The Unicode Consortium has tentatively allocated range 1CA80–1CDBF of the Supplementary Multilingual Plane for encoding the Rongorongo script. An encoding proposal has been written by Michael Everson.

Notes

References

Bibliography

External links

 The Rongorongo of Easter Island– the most complete and balanced description of rongorongo on the internet at the time, from a researcher with the CEIPP. (Archived as of February 27, 2005)
 Kohaumotu – a more recent professional site, by Philip Spaelti. Includes a mirror of the CEIPP site. 
 Rongorongo corpus viewer – see, highlight, and compare both the Barthel and Fischer transcriptions.
 Michael Everson's draft Unicode proposal for Rongorongo
 The Rock Art of Rapa Nui by Georgia Lee
 Splendid Isolation: Art of Easter Island, an exhibition catalog from The Metropolitan Museum of Art (fully available online as PDF), which contains material on Rongorongo

 
Austronesian inscriptions
Easter Island
History of Easter Island
Polynesian languages
Rapanui people
Undeciphered writing systems